Avrupalı is a 2007 Turkish comedy film directed by Ulaş Ak, starring Cem Davran, Yasemin Kozanoğlu, Sema Öztürk, İlknur Soydaş and Aydemir Akbaş. It was released on October 12, 2007.

References

External links 

 

2007 films
2000s Turkish-language films
2007 comedy films
Films set in Turkey
Turkish comedy films